Grassmann's laws describe empirical results about how the perception of mixtures of colored lights (i.e., lights that co-stimulate the same area on the retina) composed of different spectral power distributions can be algebraically related to one another in a color matching context. Discovered by Hermann Grassmann these "laws" are actually principles used to predict color match responses to a good approximation under photopic and mesopic vision.  A number of studies have examined how and why they provide poor predictions under specific conditions.

Modern interpretation

The four laws are described in modern texts with varying degrees of algebraic notation and are summarized as follows (the precise numbering and corollary definitions can vary across sources):

These laws entail an algebraic representation of colored light. Precisely, they will be , where:

Grassmann's laws can be expressed in general form by stating that for a given color with a spectral power distribution  the RGB coordinates are given by:

See also 

 Color space
 CIE 1931 color space

References 

Color
Visual system